The Dingman River is the name for a portion of the Intermediate River in Antrim County, Michigan. The Dingman River flows  from Scotts Lake northwest to Sixmile Lake, entirely within Echo Township. Via the Elk River Chain of Lakes, water from the Dingman River flows to Grand Traverse Bay on Lake Michigan.

See also
List of rivers of Michigan

References

Michigan  Streamflow Data from the USGS

Rivers of Michigan
Rivers of Antrim County, Michigan
Tributaries of Lake Michigan